A fallacy of necessity is a fallacy in the logic of a syllogism whereby a degree of unwarranted necessity is placed in the conclusion.

Example
a) Bachelors are necessarily unmarried.
b) John is a bachelor.
Therefore, c) John cannot marry.

The condition a) appears to be a tautology and therefore true. The condition b) is a statement of fact about John which makes him subject to a); that is, b) declares John a bachelor, and a) states that all bachelors are unmarried.

Because c) presumes b) will always be the case, it is a fallacy of necessity. John, of course, is always free to stop being a bachelor, simply by getting married; if he does so, b) is no longer true and thus not subject to the tautology a). In this case, c) has unwarranted necessity by assuming, incorrectly, that John cannot stop being a bachelor. Formally speaking, this type of argument equivocates between the de dicto necessity of a) and the  de re necessity of c). The argument is only valid if both a) and c) are construed de re. This, however, would undermine the argument, as a) is only a tautology de dicto – indeed, interpreted de re, it is false. Using the formal symbolism in modal logic, the de dicto expression  is a tautology, while the de re expression  is false.

See also
De dicto and de re: Context of modality
Modal logic

References

Necessity
Necessity